Oskari Forsman (born 28 January 1988) is a Finnish professional footballer who plays for Tallinna Kalev, as a goalkeeper.

Club career
On 29 December 2021, he signed with VPS for the 2022 season.

In January 2023 he started playing for Tallinna Kalev in Estonian Meistriliiga.

References

1988 births
Living people
Finnish footballers
Kotkan Työväen Palloilijat players
Oulun Palloseura players
FC Jazz players
Rovaniemen Palloseura players
TP-47 players
Turun Palloseura footballers
Kemi City F.C. players
FC Lahti players
IFK Mariehamn players
Vaasan Palloseura players
Veikkausliiga players
Ykkönen players
Kakkonen players
Meistriliiga players
Association football goalkeepers
Sportspeople from Oulu
JK Tallinna Kalev players
Finnish expatriate footballers
Finnish expatriate sportspeople in Estonia
Expatriate footballers in Estonia